Anzaite-(Ce) is a rare-earth element (REE) oxide mineral with the formula Ce4Fe2+Ti6O18(OH)2. An example of chemically related mineral is lucasite-(Ce), although it contains no iron. Cerium in anzaite-(Ce) is mainly substituted by neodymium, lanthanum, calcium and praseodymium. Titanium is substituted by niobium. Trace elements include thorium. The mineral is monoclinic, space group C2/m. Anzaite-(Ce) is hydrothermal mineral found in a carbonatite from the mineralogically prolific Kola Peninsula. The mineral name honors Anatoly N. Zaitsev, who is known for studies of carbonatites and REE.

Occurrence and association
Parent rocks for anzaite-(Ce) are silicocarbonatites of the Afrikanda alkali-ultramafic massif. These rocks underwent hydrothermal reworking, that beside anzaite-(Ce) produced also calcite, clinochlore, hibschite and titanite in expense of primary minerals.

Notes on chemistry
Cerium in anzaite-(Ce) is substituted by significant amounts of neodymium, lanthanum, calcium, and praseodymium, with minor samarium and thorium. Other impurities in the mineral composition include niobium and silicon.

Crystal structure
The crystal structure of anzaite-(Ce) characterizes in:
 the presence of layers with REE (square antiprismatic coordination) and Fe (octahedral)
 the presence of layers with Ti with coordination numbers 5 and 6
 disorder of Fe, VTi and two of four present anion sites
The disordered sites are located on the (010) planes, separated by ordered domains containing REE, VITi (octahedral) and two oxide-anion sites.

References

Oxide minerals
Cerium minerals
Lanthanide minerals
Iron(II) minerals
Titanium minerals
Monoclinic minerals
Minerals in space group 12